USS Etta M. Burns (SP-542) was a United States Navy patrol vessel in commission from 1917 to 1919.

Etta M. Burns was built as a civilian schooner in 1902.  In 1917, the U.S. Navy leased her for use as a section patrol vessel during World War I. She was commissioned as USS Etta M. Burns (SP-542) on 2 June 1917.

Assigned to the 1st Naval District, Etta M. Burns operated on patrol duties in northern New England for the rest of World War I.

Etta M. Burns was stricken from the Navy List on 3 February 1919 and returned to her owner.

References
 
 World War I Era Patrol Vessels and other Acquired Ships and Craft numbered from SP-500 through SP-599
 

Patrol vessels of the United States Navy
World War I patrol vessels of the United States
1902 ships
Schooners of the United States Navy